The 2012 World Deaf Football Championships were the second edition of the international competition of deaf football national men's and women's teams. They were organized by the International Committee of Sports for the Deaf (CISS), and were held in Ankara, Turkey between 16 and 28 July 2012. In the men's championship, Turkey won the title for the first time, defeating Egypt in the final, Ukraine became bronze medalist before Russia. In the women's championship, the United States  won the title for the first time, defeating Russia in the final, Germany became bronze medalist before Poland.

Participating nations 
Men

''

Women

References

2012
International association football competitions hosted by Turkey
2012 in disability sport
Deaf
2012 in association football
World Deaf Football Championship
2012